David Santos Zuniga (born March 1, 1968) is a retired wrestler that competed in the 1996 Olympics and several FILA Wrestling World Championships.

International career 
Zuniga placed 4th at the 1994 World Wrestling Championships and also competed at the 1995 World Wrestling Championships, 1997 World Wrestling Championships, and 1999 World Wrestling Championships.

Zuniga was a bronze medalist at the 1995 Pan American Games and a silver medalist at the 1999 Pan American Games.

At the 1996 Olympics in the Men's Greco-Roman 62 kg Zuniga defeated Ainsley Robinson in the first round before losing to Ivan Ivanov and Sergey Martynov.

References 

1968 births
Wrestlers at the 1996 Summer Olympics
American male sport wrestlers
Olympic wrestlers of the United States
Wrestlers at the 1999 Pan American Games
Pan American Games silver medalists for the United States
Pan American Games bronze medalists for the United States
Living people
Pan American Games medalists in wrestling
Medalists at the 1999 Pan American Games
20th-century American people